In coding theory, Srivastava codes, formulated by  Professor J. N. Srivastava, form a class of parameterised error-correcting codes which are a special case of alternant codes.

Definition
The original Srivastava code over GF(q) of length n is defined by a parity check matrix H of alternant form 

where the αi and zi are elements of GF(qm)

Properties
The parameters of this code are length n, dimension ≥ n − ms and minimum distance ≥ s + 1.

References 
 

Error detection and correction
Finite fields
Coding theory